Sarpakadu is a 1965 Indian Malayalam-language film, directed by J. D. Thottan and produced by P. K. Sathyapal. The film stars Madhu, Sukumari, Ambika and Adoor Bhasi. It was released on 31 December 1965.

Plot 
Dr. Krishnan and his son Dr. Balan are dedicated to eradicating death by snake bite. They go on a mission to the dense forests surrounding the mountain ranges in search of the Thanka Sarpam or the Golden Snake, believed to be the most poisonous in the world. Their intention is to conduct research based on its venom and perhaps invent an anti-venom that would be a remedy for all snake bites. Their compounder also accompanies them. They stay in the forest guest house and the watcher there, Raghavan Pilllai, guides them in their search. But their efforts fail. Balan falls in love with Nagaprabha, the elder daughter of Swami, a hermit who lives in the forests along with his daughters and engaged in worshipping his family deity Nagamma, the Snake Goddess. The compounder falls in love with the younger daughter Nagalatha. One day, Balan and the compounder reach Swami's hermitage and see the Thanka Sarpam on the idol of Nagamma inside the cave temple there. Balan and his father request Swami to hand the Thanka Sarpam to them and offer a huge sum of money. Swami becomes furious and drives them away. Meanwhile, Nagalatha is attacked by a bear and Krishnan's attempts to save her fail. Swami is shocked when he learns on his return to the hermitage that the Thanka Sarpam was stolen by Balan while he was away. Swami reaches the guest house and begins playing the makudi or the snake charmer's flute. The Thanka Sarpam leaves the pouch in which it was tied up. Swami forces the snake to bite Balan and Krishnan is unable to save him. Nagaprabha begs her father to save the life of her beloved. Swami accedes to the request. He plays the makudi, the snake sucks out the venom, and fatally strikes it head on the floor. Balan is saved. Kari Nagam or the Mountain Cobra believed to be the companion of the Thanka Sarpam reaches there and bites Swami. Krishnan shoots the snake to death. Before dying Swami wishes Krishnan success in inventing the anti-venom but also requests him to respect snake worship, not to kill snakes, and to honour the traditional methods of treatment for snake bite.

Cast 
Madhu as Balachandran
Sukumari as Nagalatha, Nagaprabha's sister
Ambika as Nagaprabha
Adoor Bhasi as Compounder Unni
Muthukulam Raghavan Pillai as Watchman Raghavan Pilla
Kottarakkara Sreedharan Nair as Temple Priest
Kottayam Chellappan as Doctor

Soundtrack 
The music was composed by M. S. Baburaj and the lyrics were written by Abhayadev.

References

External links 
 

1965 films
1960s Malayalam-language films
Films about snakes